The 2015 FIM MotoGP World Championship was the premier class of the 67th F.I.M. Road Racing World Championship season. The championship was won by Spanish rider Jorge Lorenzo, racing for Movistar Yamaha MotoGP. It was his third and final world title in the MotoGP category, his fifth overall in Grand Prix motorcycle racing. The season had 18 races, beginning in Qatar and finishing in Valencia, which determined who would be world champion between Movistar Yamaha teammates Lorenzo and runner-up Valentino Rossi. It was first time since 2006 that the world title was decided on the final race of the season. Lorenzo also had the most pole positions, fastest laps and race wins throughout the season; while Rossi had the most finishes, completing every race throughout the season, while Lorenzo had one race retirement in San Marino.

2015 was the final season that Bridgestone was the sole tyre supplier for MotoGP, as Michelin became the sole tyre supplier for the 2016 season.

The 2015 season also saw the début of the Suzuki GSX-RR and Aprilia RS-GP. The GSX-RR previously made an appearance at the 2014 Valencian Grand Prix ahead of a full-season return for Suzuki as a factory team for the first time since 2011 and the RS-GP was used by Gresini Racing after the team split from Honda at the end of last season.

This season is well known for the Sepang clash, which involved a collision between two-time defending champion Marc Márquez and then-championship leader, Rossi. The clash remains one of the most memorable and controversial moments in the sport's history, with Rossi's penalty (a grid demotion in Valencia) for the incident helping Lorenzo win the race in Valencia and clinch his third MotoGP world title.

Season summary
Marc Márquez started the season as the defending riders' champion, having won his second consecutive title in 2014. He had been undefeated in championships throughout his MotoGP career and won a record breaking 13 wins in a season.

Valentino Rossi led the championship for almost the entire season as he chased a tenth world title, but ultimately, the honours went to his Yamaha Motor Racing teammate Jorge Lorenzo, who took his third MotoGP title and a fifth world title overall. Lorenzo started the season quietly with three finishes off the podium, Rossi took wins in Qatar and an eventful win in Argentina, with Rossi chasing Márquez down for the lead before the two riders collided on the penultimate lap. Rossi stayed upright but Márquez was unable to rejoin the race, with Rossi calling Márquez voicing his displeasure in the press conference after the race, beginning an estrangement between the two riders that would impact the season and Lorenzo's eventual championship.

Thereafter, Lorenzo took four successive wins for the first time in his career to bring himself back into the championship race, before Rossi won at Assen. Lorenzo did not win again until Brno, taking the championship lead on countback, but ceded it back to Rossi, when he won at Silverstone. Lorenzo crashed out at Misano, while Rossi finished fifth ending a 16-race streak of podium finishes after both Yamaha riders were caught out by wet weather.

Rossi and Márquez again collided at Assen on the final lap; Rossi rejoined the circuit through the gravel and went on to win the race, while race direction deemed the incident as a racing incident.

At San Marino, Rossi was given a penalty point on his licence, for impeding Lorenzo in qualifying, an incident that would cause implications later on in the season.

The Australian Grand Prix was won by Márquez, with Lorenzo in second and Rossi finishing fourth, in a race that is considered to be one of the greatest in MotoGP's history. With the top three in the championship, along with Andrea Iannone's Ducati going head to head, with over 50 overtakes between the top four throughout the race, 13 lead changes and Márquez setting the fastest lap on the final lap to ensure victory. Despite the incredible response from fans about the race, Rossi was not happy with how the race unfolded and made comments about Márquez, making accusing Márquez of helping Lorenzo in his title aspirations at Phillip Island in the pre-event press conference at Malaysia, a claim that Márquez refuted, leading up to one of the most infamous races in the sports history one week later.

The Malaysian race, was originally at risk of being cancelled due to smoke from fires in Indonesia impacting the track, however the race would go ahead with Rossi and Márquez colliding for a third time during the season. After a series of 18 overtakes and exchanges of positions between the two, during the seventh lap of the race, Rossi made a move on Márquez at Turn 14, pushing Márquez to the outside of the circuit. The two riders made contact and Márquez fell from his bike. He remounted and returned to the pits but had to retire from the race. Rossi maintained the third place that the pair had been battling over until the end of the race. The incident divided fans, pundits and the riders on the grid, with Lorenzo made a gesture showing his disapproval at the move and deemed the penalty as "inadequate" and was booed off the podium, with race winner Pedrosa criticising Rossi's reaction to the incident by calling it a contradiction based on his previous comments on racing incidents. Race Direction reviewed the incident and deemed Rossi at fault for the collision, and three penalty points were added to his licence. With this, it meant that Rossi was forced to start the final race in Valencia from the back of the grid, despite appealing the penalty to the Court of Arbitration for Sport, the penalty was ultimately upheld; with Lorenzo submitting a statement towards the appeal and later apologised for his actions on the podium. Rossi voiced his regret at his move on Márquez, but did not apologise for the incident occurring while Márquez stood his ground on his riding style in Malaysia.

Following the fallout from Malaysia, which included a clash between the Márquez family and Italian television reporters who invaded the family property in Barcelona, Lorenzo being wrongfully accused of storming race direction demanding a penalty for Rossi, which the members of the media would later retract the story and Rossi's protest being overturned being met with hostile reactions from some fans; FIM president Vito Ippolito deemed the events as a "damaging effect on the staging of our competitions and poisoned the atmosphere around the sport", with Ippolito and Dorna Sports boss Carmelo Ezpeleta calling a private meeting for all riders and crew chiefs in Valencia, cancelling the pre-event press conference, also meeting with Lorenzo, Márquez and Rossi privately before the race weekend began.

In the final five races, Rossi finished ahead of Lorenzo once, as Lorenzo continued to close the points gap; at a maximum of 23 after San Marino, Lorenzo pulled it back to 7 going into Valencia with the champion to be determined at the final race of the season for the first time in nine years when Nicky Hayden defeated Rossi for the title at Valencia.

At the final race, Lorenzo took his seventh win of the season and won the world title by five points, leading the world championship for the first time all season while Rossi could only finish fourth gaining over 10 positions throughout the race.

Third place in the final riders' championship standings went to Márquez, who won five races during the season, but six retirements during the campaign stopped him from challenging the Yamaha pair in the championship run-in. The only other rider to win a race during the season was Márquez's Repsol Honda teammate, Dani Pedrosa. Pedrosa missed three races at the start of the season, after electing to undergo surgery to alleviate issues with arm-pump. Upon his return, he did not podium until Catalunya, and ultimately, took two wins in the closing four races at Motegi, and Sepang.

Other championship standings
In the other championships, the eleven wins for Rossi and Lorenzo were enough for Yamaha to take the teams' title by over 200 points ahead of Repsol Honda, and the manufacturers' title by 52 points ahead of Honda. Amongst the class of rookies, Suzuki rider Maverick Viñales took the IRTA Cup, finishing in twelfth place overall, while Héctor Barberá of Avintia Racing was the best-placed Open class rider, in fifteenth.

Calendar
The following Grands Prix took place in 2015:

 ‡ = Night race
 †† = Saturday race

Calendar changes
 The British Grand Prix had been scheduled to return to Donington Park for the first time since 2009, ahead of a planned move to the brand-new Circuit of Wales in 2016. However, Donington Park pulled out of hosting the event on 10 February 2015, citing financial delays.

Teams and riders
Manufacturers who had not won a dry race since the start of the 2013 season or were new to the class could enter the Factory category with all the Open concessions.

A provisional entry list was released by the Fédération Internationale de Motocyclisme on 23 October 2014. An updated entry list was released on 2 February 2015.

All the bikes used Bridgestone tyres.

Team changes
 Suzuki returned to MotoGP as a constructor after a four-year hiatus.
 Aprilia made an official return to the championship entering two factory-supported bikes with Gresini Racing. The Italian team ended its long partnership with Honda, having raced their bikes since 1997.
 Marc VDS Racing expanded its operations to enter a Honda bike in the MotoGP category, having taken on the Factory class bike previously run by Gresini.
 LCR Honda entered a second bike in the Open category.
 Avintia Racing left its Kawasaki-based machinery to switch to Ducati bikes.
 Paul Bird Motorsport left MotoGP at the end of the 2014 season to concentrate on their British Superbike Championship campaign.

Rider changes
 Stefan Bradl left the LCR Honda team and moved to Forward Racing. After the German Grand Prix, Bradl moved to Gresini Racing.
 Cal Crutchlow left the Ducati Team to take Bradl's place at LCR Honda.
 Andrea Iannone filled the seat vacated by Crutchlow with the Ducati factory team.
 Scott Redding left Gresini Racing and returned to Marc VDS Racing for their MotoGP campaign.
 Moto3 rider Jack Miller moved directly into MotoGP, with LCR Honda.
 Colin Edwards retired from racing at the end of the 2014 season and became a Yamaha test rider.
 Loris Baz made his MotoGP debut with Forward Racing.
 After competing in the final half of the 2014 season with Forward Racing, Alex de Angelis replaced Danilo Petrucci at the IodaRacing Project.
 Danilo Petrucci moved from the IodaRacing Project to join Pramac Racing.
 Aleix Espargaró moved from Forward Racing to join the factory Suzuki team, with Maverick Viñales making the move from Moto2 to partner him.
 Eugene Laverty returned to the championship – having last competed in 2008 in the 250cc class – racing with the Aspar Team.
Before the German Grand Prix, Melandri left Aprilia, and was replaced by Michael Laverty. Bradl replaced Laverty afterwards.
 Hiroshi Aoyama moved from the Aspar Team to become a test rider for HRC. Aoyama returned to the series on two occasions during the 2015 season, to replace injured riders.

In-season changes
 Hiroshi Aoyama replaced Dani Pedrosa for the races in Austin, Texas and Argentina, as Pedrosa elected to undergo surgery to alleviate issues with arm-pump. This was extended to include the Spanish Grand Prix, as Pedrosa's recovery took longer than expected. Aoyama also replaced Karel Abraham at the Sachsenring with AB Motoracing.
 Claudio Corti replaced Stefan Bradl for the German Grand Prix, after Bradl fractured his right scaphoid at Assen. Corti was replaced by Toni Elías prior to the Aragon Grand Prix.
 Forward Racing did not compete at the Indianapolis Grand Prix following the arrest of team boss Giovanni Cuzari. Bradl terminated his contract with the team, and joined Gresini Racing, to replace Michael Laverty.
 Toni Elías replaced Karel Abraham at the Indianapolis Grand Prix, as Abraham recovered from injuries sustained at the Catalan Grand Prix. Elías later replaced Claudio Corti at Forward Racing, prior to the Aragon Grand Prix.
 Alex de Angelis suffered serious injuries in a crash during free practice at the Japanese Grand Prix. He was replaced by Damian Cudlin for the Australian and Malaysian races, and Broc Parkes in Valencia.
 In order to aid his recovery from injuries sustained at the Catalan Grand Prix, Karel Abraham stepped down from his AB Motoracing ride. He was replaced by Kousuke Akiyoshi in Japan, and Anthony West for the remainder of the season.

Results and standings

Grands Prix

Riders' standings
Scoring system
Points were awarded to the top fifteen finishers. A rider had to finish the race to earn points.

Constructors' standings
Scoring system
Points were awarded to the top fifteen finishers. A rider had to finish the race to earn points.

 Each constructor got the same number of points as their best placed rider in each race.

Teams' standings
The teams' standings were based on results obtained by regular and substitute riders; wild-card entries were ineligible.

References

External links
 The official website of Grand Prix motorcycle racing

 
MotoGP
Grand Prix motorcycle racing seasons